Diaphania meridialis is a moth in the family Crambidae. It was described by Hiroshi Yamanaka in 1972. It is found in Taiwan.

References

Moths described in 1972
Diaphania